Krasnaya Roshcha is a rural locality (a village) in Slednevskoye Rural Settlement, Alexandrovsky District, Vladimir Oblast, Russia. The population was 55 as of 2010. There are 2 streets.

Geography 
The village is located 3 km north-east from Alexandrov.

References 

Rural localities in Alexandrovsky District, Vladimir Oblast